Lončarica   is a village in Croatia. It is off of the D5 highway, located between the towns of Grubisno Polje and Verovitica.

Populated places in Bjelovar-Bilogora County